Eduardo Schwank was the defending champion; however, he didn't take part in tournament this year.
Marc Gicquel won in the final 3–6, 6–1, 6–4, against Mathieu Montcourt.

Seeds

Draw

Final four

Top half

Bottom half

External Links
 Main Draw
 Qualifying Draw

BNP Paribas Primrose Bordeaux - Singles
2009 Singles